Helen Smith is a forensic psychologist in Knoxville, Tennessee, who specializes in violent children and adults. She holds a Ph.D. from the University of Tennessee and master's degrees from The New School for Social Research and the City University of New York. She has written The Scarred Heart: Understanding and Identifying Kids Who Kill, and was writer and executive producer of Six, a documentary about the murder of a family in Tennessee by teens from Kentucky. The film highlights the inadequacies of the school, mental health and criminal justice systems in preventive treatment of troubled teens; the film was shown at a 2003 film festival in Tennessee.

More recently, Smith wrote Men on Strike: Why Men Are Boycotting Marriage, Fatherhood, and the American Dream - and Why It Matters. The National Review interviewed Smith about the book which was also discussed in the media, and within an op-ed piece in the Boston Globe. The Independent Women's Forum presents Smith as an example of a modern feminist, one who is also an advocate for men, and Smith's comments about the lack of support for men appeared in a 2017 article in The Public Eye. The Southern Poverty Law Center includes Smith in their information on men's rights activists.

Selected publications

References

External links

 

21st-century American psychologists
American women psychologists
Female critics of feminism
American bloggers
The New School alumni
University of Tennessee alumni
People from Knoxville, Tennessee
Year of birth missing (living people)
Living people
City University of New York alumni
American women bloggers
21st-century American women